UFC 55: Fury was a mixed martial arts event held by the Ultimate Fighting Championship on October 7, 2005 at the Mohegan Sun Arena in Uncasville, Connecticut. The event was broadcast live on pay-per-view in the United States, and later released on DVD. This would be the last UFC to air live on a Friday until UFC 141, which aired on December 30, 2011.

Commentary team
Craig Hummer, play by play commentator
Joe Rogan, color commentator

Results

See also 
 Ultimate Fighting Championship
 List of UFC champions
 List of UFC events
 2005 in UFC

Sources
UFC 55: Fury Results on Sherdog.com

Ultimate Fighting Championship events
2005 in mixed martial arts
Mixed martial arts in Connecticut
Sports in Uncasville, Connecticut
2005 in sports in Connecticut